Dumbarton was a burgh constituency represented in the House of Commons of the Parliament of the United Kingdom from 1983 until 2005. It was largely absorbed into the new constituency of Dunbartonshire West, with Helensburgh joining Argyll and Bute.

The Dumbarton constituency of the Scottish Parliament, which was created in 1999 with the same boundaries, continues to exist.

Boundaries 

It consisted of the towns of Dumbarton, the Vale of Leven, and Helensburgh, plus a significant rural hinterland.

Members of Parliament

Election results

Elections of the 1980s

Elections of the 1990s

Elections of the 2000s

References 

Historic parliamentary constituencies in Scotland (Westminster)
Constituencies of the Parliament of the United Kingdom established in 1983
Constituencies of the Parliament of the United Kingdom disestablished in 2005